Han Dong (born 17 May 1961) is a Chinese writer of essays, poetry, short stories and novels.

Dong was born in Nanjing but spent much of his childhood in the countryside, where his parents had been "sent-down" during the Cultural Revolution.

List of works

Banished!. Translated by Nicky Harman. Honolulu: University of Hawaii Press, 2009.
A Phone Call from Dalian: Selected Poems of Han Dong. Translated by Nicky Harman. Brookline: Zephyr Press, 2012.
A Tabby-cat’s Tale. Translated by Nicky Harman. Berlin: Frisch & Co., 2014.

References 

People's Republic of China essayists
Writers from Nanjing
People's Republic of China poets
Chinese male short story writers
1961 births
Living people
Poets from Jiangsu
Chinese male novelists
Short story writers from Jiangsu
People's Republic of China short story writers